The Colonial Athletic Association Men's Basketball Player of the Year is a basketball award given to the Colonial Athletic Association's most outstanding player. The award was first given following the 1982–83 season, when the conference was known as the ECAC South basketball league. In 1985, the conference expanded to offer more sports, and became the Colonial Athletic Association.

The first award, the only tie, was given to Dan Ruland of James Madison and Carlos Yates of George Mason. Two different players have won the award three times. David Robinson of Navy won in 1984, 1985, and 1986. George Evans won in 1999, 2000, and 2001 while playing for George Mason. Evans' first award in 1999 was as a 28-year-old sophomore—he had served seven years in the United States Army, seeing combat in Somalia, Bosnia, and Desert Storm. Steve Hood of James Madison, Odell Hodge of Old Dominion, Brett Blizzard of UNC Wilmington, Eric Maynor of VCU, Charles Jenkins of Hofstra, Jerrelle Benimon of Towson, Justin Wright-Foreman of Hofstra and Aaron Estrada of Hofstra have each won the award twice.

Hofstra has the most all-time awards with eight and most individual recipients with five. As of July 2022, it is the only one of the five schools with the most awards to still be in the conference. George Mason (six winners) left for the Atlantic 10 in 2013. James Madison, Old Dominion and VCU have each had four winners; James Madison left for the Sun Belt Conference in 2022, Old Dominion left for Conference USA in 2013, and VCU left for the A-10 in 2012. Navy's three wins by Robinson were won while the team was a conference member for just nine years. Another charter member, Richmond, won three awards before leaving the conference in 2001. Other original members to leave, American and East Carolina, each have one recipient. Of the conference's current members, William & Mary went the longest without its first winner. In 2015, 32 years after the award was first handed out, Marcus Thornton claimed William & Mary's first ever CAA Player of the Year honor.

Key

Winners

Winners by school
The CAA began in 1982 when it was known as the ECAC South. The CAA was officially organized in 1985 when it expanded from only a basketball conference. Awards from the ECAC are included.

Footnotes

References

Awards established in 1983
NCAA Division I men's basketball conference players of the year
Player